This is a list of members of the European Parliament for the United Kingdom in the 1999 to 2004 session, ordered by name.

For a list ordered by constituency, see Members of the European Parliament for the United Kingdom 1999–2004 by region.

List

See also
Members of the European Parliament 1999–2004
List of members of the European Parliament, 1999–2004 - for a full alphabetical list
1999 European Parliament election in the United Kingdom

Footnotes

1999
List
United Kingdom